Action Missionaire d'Évangélisation des nations TV (AMEN TV)
 Antenne A
 Canal Tropical Télévision (Tropicana TV)
 CMB TV
 Radio Télévision Message de Vie (RTMV)
 Radio-Télévision nationale congolaise (RTNC) : RTNC1, RTNC2, RTNC3, RTNC4
 Raga TV, Raga+
 Télévision Kin Malebo
 canal le chemin la verite et la vie (CVV)
 Nzondo TV
 Radio Télévision Catholique Elikya (RTCE)
 Radio Télévision Sentinelle
 Tropicana TV
 Radio Télévision Puissance (RTP)
 Canal Future
 Radio Télévision la voix de l'aigle (RTVA)
 Radio Télévision armée de l'éternel (RTAE)
 RTGA
 Radio Télévision Kintuadi (RTK)
 Digital Congo

Television stations, list
Kinshasa television stations